The 1998 United States Senate election in Oregon was held on November 3, 1998. Incumbent Democratic U.S. Senator Ron Wyden won re-election to his first full term, defeating Republican nominee John Lim, a state senator in a landslide (Lim only carried Malheur County). As of 2022, this is the last time Grant County and Harney County have supported a Democrat in a U.S. Senate election.

Democratic nomination
 John Sweeney
 Ron Wyden, incumbent U.S. Senator

Results

Republican nomination
 Valentine Christian
 John Lim, State Senator and candidate for Governor in 1990
 John Michael Fitzpatrick

Results

Results

See also
 1998 United States Senate elections

References

Senate
Oregon
1998